Abbans-Dessus is a commune in the Doubs department in the Bourgogne-Franche-Comté region in eastern France.

The inhabitants of the commune are known as Abbanais or Abbanaises.

The similarly named commune Abbans-Dessous lies 1.5 km to the north.

Geography
Abbans-Dessus is located some 20 km south-west of Besançon and 3 km north of Quingey on the hills between Le Doubs River to the north-west and the Loue river to the south-east in the west of the Doubs department. The D13 road from Byans-sur-Doubs to Chouzelot passes through the south of the commune. Access to the village is by the D107 which branches off the D13 and goes north to the village continuing north to join the D105 north-east of Abbans-Dessous. The commune is long and narrow oriented north-east with bands of forest lining the long borders and the rest of the commune is farmland.

An unnamed stream rises in the south of the commune and flows north to join the Doubs river to join the Doubs river north-east of Abbans-Dessous. Abbans-Dessus is located midway between the Loue and Doubs rivers although it does not border on either river but overlooks the Doubs river.

Neighbouring Communes and Villages

Toponymy
The name Abbans is based on a German man's name Abbo with the Germanic suffix -ing.

History
The village is built on a rocky outcrop overlooking the forest of Chaux and the Doubs valley. It is likely, in view of its strategic location, that it was a Gallo-Roman oppidum. Abbans-Dessus has a highly visible castle that is well known as the Keep where the Marquis Jouffroy d'Abbans, the inventor of the steamboat, largely conceived his work. There is mention made of the building in 1091. It belonged to the Lords of Abbans, important figures in the region's history. When, at the end of the 13th  century, the sons of Philippe d'Abbans inherited the lordship, they created a "Front-Village" and a "Back-Village" The "Back Castle" passed to William and Richard built the "Front Castle" nearby. In 1290 Richard's daughter chose to sell the Front Castle to John I of Chalon-Arlay and in 1297 he granted Abbans a franchise charter.

Abbans-Dessus was a cereal crops and livestock farming area. Viticulture was established in the commune until the 19th century when it was totally eradicated by phylloxera.

Heraldry and Genealogy of the Squires of Abbans

Heraldry

Genealogy
Humbert Abbans (? – after 1134).
Marriage and succession: 
His wife is unknown, he had two sons:
 Hubald
 Roger

Hubald of Abbans (? – after 1143), Squire and Lord of Abbans.

He was mentioned in a charter of 1143, in which the Pope Lucius II confirmed the rights of the Church of Saint-Madeleine in Besançon:
"Dimidium Mansum, in castris Toragii vestre terre, quod expugnastis duello, contra Hubaldum of Habens".

Marriage and succession: 
His wife is unknown, he had two sons:
 Louis I of Abbans
 Olivier d'Abbans, knight, benefactor of the Cherlieu Abbey in the diocese of Besançon, father of Louis II.

Louis I of Abbans (? – after 1157), Lord of Abbans, knight and squire, he donated to the Abbey Notre-Dame of Billon and was confirmed in 1156.
Marriage and succession: 
His wife is unknown, he had four sons:
 Humbert II
 Thiebaud, (? – before 1190)
 Olivier, abbot of the Monastery of Luxeuil from 1189 to 1201, Vicar-General of the diocese of Besançon in the absence of the Archbishop Thierry II of Montfaucon who left for the Third Crusade during which he died of the plague in 1191
 Otto, who died childless.

Humbert II of Abbans (? – after 1182), Squire and Knight, Lord of Abbans, Purgerot, and Augicour.
Marriage and succession: 
His wife is unknown, he had one son and one daughter:
 Louis II
 Julienne, she married Lambert of Cicon.

Louis II of Abbans (? – after 1235), squire and knight, Lord of Abbans. His seal attached to a deed of gift to the Cherlieu Abbey, of a horse, armed and with a banner in his arms.
Marriage and succession: 
His wife is unknown, he had 3 sons and 3 daughters:
 Philippe
 Richard (? – 1281), Knight, Lord of Abbans, Villers-Saint-Georges, and Noironte.
 Guillaume, a Knight
 Nicolette
 Willemette
 Odilette

Philippe of Abbans knight, Lord of Abbans. In 1224 he joined a number of hostages that the Count of Chalon  gave to Besançon to guarantee a treaty he had concluded with them.
Marriage and succession: 
He married Richarde, daughter of Richard of Chay and Agnes of Arguel, by whom he had 1 son and 1 daughter:
 Guillaume
 Guillemette, the first wife of Henri de Conflandey and her second husband was Hugh de Montferrand.

Guillaume of Abbans (? – before 1336), Squire and Knight, Lord of Abbans.
Marriage and succession: 
He married Isabella (? – after 1300), daughter of Pons of Cicon and Agnes of Pelousey, with whom he had one son:
 Amiet

Amiet of Abbans (? – August 1314), Squire, Lord of Abbans.
Marriage and succession: 
He married Isabella by whom he had that 1 daughter and 1 son:
 Jeanne, she married Henry de Saint-Aubin (circa 1310 – ?), knight
 Jean (? – 1370), Knight and Squire, Lord of  Noironte and Châtillon-le-Duc, he married Marguerite, daughter of Thiebaud Belvoir III and Jeanne de Montfaucon, by whom he had a daughter who passed the chateau of Abbans to Guillaume of Arbon. By inheritance the chateau passed to the Joux family, then the Grammonts and the Jouffroys.

Administration

List of Successive Mayors of Abbans-Dessus

Intercommunality
Abbans-Dessus is a member of the Community of communes Loue-Lison, which was created on 1 January 2017. It comprises 74 communes, and has its seat in Ornans.

Population

Sites and monuments
 The Chateau de Jouffroy d'Abbans (15th and 18th centuries) is best known for its dungeon, where Claude-François-Dorothée, marquis de Jouffroy d'Abbans (1751–1832) devised the first steamboat with paddlewheels.
 Church of the Assumption
 House
 Street with walls covered in flowers
 Lavoir (Public Laundry)

Notable people linked to the commune
 Claude-François-Dorothée, marquis de Jouffroy d'Abbans

Bibliography
 Genealogical History of the Lords of Salins, Jean-Baptiste Guillaume, Jean-Antoine Vieille, Besançon, 1757, 39 pages 
 Roglo, Lord of Abbans

See also
 Communes of the Doubs department

References

External links
 Abbans-Dessus on Géoportail, National Geographic Institute (IGN)  website 
 Abans desous on the 1750 Cassini Map

Communes of Doubs